Barracouta Ridge is a long jagged ridge which terminates on the north in Webster Knob. The ridge is an extension from the base of Mount Fridtjof Nansen into the head of Strom Glacier, Queen Maud Mountains. It was discovered and visited in 1929 by the geological party under Laurence Gould of the Byrd Antarctic Expedition, 1928–30, and was climbed by geologists of the Southern Party of the New Zealand Geological Survey Antarctic Expedition, 1963–64. The descriptive name applied by the Southern Party derives from the appearance of the toothlike pinnacle along the crest of the ridge, reminiscent of a Barracouta.

References
 

Nunataks of the Ross Dependency
Dufek Coast